Watermen's stairs were semipermanent structures that formed part of a complex transport network of public stairs, causeways and alleys in use from the 14th century to access the waters of the tidal River Thames in England. They were used by watermen, who taxied passengers across and along the river in London.

Stairs were used at high tide, and causeways were used at low tide, built down to the littoral water level from street level, their location being memorised during a waterman's apprenticeship. Stairs were recognised by custom and practice as safe plying places to pick up and put down passengers and were a valuable aid to rescue if anyone was unfortunate enough to fall into the river, as they were often built adjacent to a public house.

History

The embanking of the tidal Thames was a centuries-old process that lined the river with walls that were meant to stop high water overflowing onto adjacent lands.  Alleyways leading down to the Thames became the only practical way to cross over the river via boat as Old London Bridge was frequently blocked. Wharves and later rudimentary docks began to be used to offload goods but most ships simply moored in lines in the middle of the river and their cargo was rowed to shore and carried up shoreline stairs. Some of the Thames original shoreline did remain free from the construction of houses or walls. The access to the river was via shore, gaps between houses used to launch boats. Samuel Pepys in his diaries of 1665 mentions making landfall at Dukes Shore for example before wading up the beach to Narrow Street. As late as the 1850s nearly all new bridges were built with stairs at both ends, and generally on both sides.

The Embankment which artificially engineered the Thames' natural course in the 1860s left buildings that had been located on the gently sloping incline to the river some distance from the water's edge.

The growth of steamboats in the 1850s allowed boats to dock at specially constructed steamboat piers. Grab chains were built into the now steeply embanked high walls of the central Pool of the river Thames as an aide to rescue but access to the busiest central areas was geared towards mass transit by the 1890s. Later with the increased use of the Hackney carriage, London's stairs gradually fell into disuse or were simply built over and the abrupt collapse of traffic in the up river docks on the central tidal Thames in the 1960s effectively ended their use as transit points within London's transport network.

Cause célèbre

During the 1990s the continued existence of these sites as rights of way had seemed untenable, despite their importance to London's transport history and as future sites for archaeological investigation. In the 1980s a local lobby group initially based around the Isle of Dogs began to campaign for more local involvement, in the urban renewal of London's East End. Many local people who "worked the river" began to raise awareness of the decaying state of and lack of river access to the Thames as many stairs and small Docks were bulldozed during massive redevelopment. It became something of a cause célèbre amongst local people and amateur rowers across London who now felt that the regeneration of London's port districts specifically favoured businesses and property development over the preservation and fair use of river access for local communities and the public.

Meanwhile, the newly formed – the Pool of London Partnership – established in 1996 to help promote urban renewal of the areas north and south of the river began to successfully lobby for the location of Greater London Authority (GLA) building to be in the Pool of London development area.

In 2002, The City of London recommended that river and foreshore access, the stairs and steps on the Thames, should be opened up where there is a "historical precedent and a practical need".

Barely eleven Stairs are still in existence, tucked away on the quieter stretches of the river, semi derelict as they  have not been in regular use since the 1930s. Many of the pubs to which they provided access from water level were destroyed by bombing during World War II. For centuries these locations dotted along the entire length of the river Thames shoreline were the final points of embarkation at which countless individuals began a forced or chosen new life overseas. It remains to be seen if these strange emotive architectural curiosities, milestones in London's long maritime history, that are located outside the now restored old Pool of London's borders, will be preserved for future generations.

Public stairs in use on the River Thames early 1700s
In 1746 the surveyor and cartographer John Rocque published a map of London that listed the main stairs and docks then in use on the Thames.

On the London side of the river, going up stream:

 The Old Swan,
 Coleharbour,
 The Steel Yard,
 Dowgate,
 Three Cranes,
 Queenhithe,
 Trig,
 Paul's Wharf,
 Common Stairs, or Puddle Dock,
 Blackfriars,
 Dorset,
 White Friars,
 Temple,
 Essex,
 Arundel,
 Surrey,
 Strand,
 Somerset,
 Savoy,
 Worcester,
 Salisbury,
 Ivybridge,
 Exchange,
 York,
 Black Lion,
 Hungerford,
 Whitehall,
 Privy Garden,
 Manchester,
 Westminster Stairs,
 Parliament,
 Horse Ferry,
 Ranelagh,
 Hospital,
 Bishop,
 Old Magpie,
 Feathers,
 Old Church,
 Beaufort.

Going through the bridge, still on the London side:

 Billingsgate,
 Sabbs,
 Custom House,
 Tower,
 Irongate,
 St. Catherine's,
 Ship,
 Brew House,
 Hermitage,
 Wapping Old,
 Wapping New,
 Execution Dock,
 Wapping Dock,
 King Edward's,
 New Crane,
 King James's,
 Shadwell,
 Bell Wharf,
 Ratcliff Cross,
 Limehouse,
 Duke's Shore

Crossing over to the Surrey side above bridge:

 Pepper Alley,
 St. Saviour's,
 Bank End,
 Horseshoe Alley,
 New Thames Street,
 Mold Strand,
 Falcon,
 Paris Garden,
 Marygold,
 Bull,
 Old Barge House,
 Morris's Causeway,
 Cupid's or Cuper's,
 King's Arms,
 Stangate,
 Lambeth Palace,
 Horse Ferry,
 Vauxhall.

Going down through the bridge on the Surrey side:

 Tooley,
 Battle,
 Bridge,
 Pickle Herring,
 Still,
 Old,
 New,
 Savory's Mill,
 East Lane,
 Three Mariners,
 Fountain,
 Mill,
 Rotherhithe or Redriff,
 Cherry Garden,
 King,
 Elephant,
 Church,
 Swan,
 Globe,
 Shepherd and Dock,
 Pageant.
 Plus about fifteen more down to Deptford, Greenwich and Woolwich.

When J. Wallis and J. Cary published their 1784 map of "London, Westminster and Southwark" (which showed the Thames from the White Hart Stairs above Lambeth Palace down to Trinity Steps near Stepney), the stairs appear as follows. London side: The stair and bridges going downstream from Horse Ferry are:

 Parliament,
 Westminster Bridge,
 Manchester,
 Privy Garden,
 Whitehall,
 Hungerford,
 York Buildings,
 Salisbury,
 Savoy,
 Somerset Watergate,
 Strand,
 Surrey,
 Arundel,
 Essex,
 Temple,
 White Friars,
 Dorset,
 Blackfriars Bridge,
 Puddle Dock,
 Trig,
 Queen Hith,
 3 Crane,
 Steel Yard,
 Cole Harbour,
 Old Swan,
 London Bridge,
 Billingsgate,
 Custom House,
 Tower,
 Iron Gate,
 Parsons,
 Hermitage,
 Union,
 Wapping Old,
 Wapping New,
 Wapping Dock,
 King Edward,
 Frying Pan,
 New Crane,
 King James's,
 Pelican,
 Shadwell Dock,
 Coal,
 Bell Wharf,
 Stone,
 Trinity and Stage.Surrey side:  The stairs and bridges* going downstream from White Hart are:'''

 Horse Ferry,
 Lambeth,
 Standgate,
 Westminster Bridge,
 King's Arms,
 Cuper's Bridge,
 Morris's Causeway,
 Old Barge House,
 Bull,
 Marygold,
 Bl Fryars Bridge,
 Paris Garden,
 Falcon,
 Goat,
 Horseshoe Alley,
 Bank End,
 St. Mary Overies,
 Cock Alley,
 Pepper Alley,
 London Bridge,
 Tooley,
 Pickle Herring,
 Still,
 Horsleydown Old,
 Horsleydown New,
 Savory Mill,
 East Lane,
 3 Mariners,
 Fountain,
 Cherry Garden,
 W Lane,
 Redriff,
 King,
 Elephant,
 Church,
 Hanover,
 Russel's Mill
 King & Queen.

See also
 Thames Path
 Lower Marsh Market

References

Sources
 Rocque's map of London online http://freepages.genealogy.rootsweb.com/~genmaps/genfiles/COU_files/ENG/LON/Rocque/rocque_index.htm
 Pool of London http://www.pooloflondon.co.uk/news.builder/00546.html
 Historical precedent and a practical need http://cms.cityoflondon.gov.uk/NR/rdonlyres/B793C4BC-BC84-4292-BD17-8B4039003E29/0/DP_PL_riversideappraisal.pdf
 English Heritage http://www.english-heritage.org.uk/upload/pdf/thamesgateway.pdf
 Grab Chains https://publications.parliament.uk/pa/cm199495/cmhansrd/1995-04-19/Writtens-2.html
 Ted Johns http://politics.guardian.co.uk/politicsobituaries/story/0,1441,1214789,00.html
 First Settlers Monument http://www.tower-bridge.org.uk/fact1.htm
 First Settlers Monument http://www.tower-bridge.org.uk/monplan3.jpg

External links

 http://www.thames21.org.uk/
 Peter Finch, 2010, "Access to the River Thames: Steps, stairs and landing places on the Tidal Thames", River Thames Society, https://www.riverthamessociety.org.uk/publications

Buildings and structures on the River Thames
History of the River Thames
History of transport in London